In mathematics, a quadratically closed field is a field in which every element has a square root.

Examples
 The field of complex numbers is quadratically closed; more generally, any algebraically closed field is quadratically closed.
 The field of real numbers is not quadratically closed as it does not contain a square root of −1.
 The union of the finite fields  for n ≥ 0 is quadratically closed but not algebraically closed.
 The field of constructible numbers is quadratically closed but not algebraically closed.

Properties
 A field is quadratically closed if and only if it has universal invariant equal to 1.
 Every quadratically closed field is a Pythagorean field but not conversely (for example, R is Pythagorean); however, every non-formally real Pythagorean field is quadratically closed.
 A field is quadratically closed if and only if its Witt–Grothendieck ring is isomorphic to Z under the dimension mapping.
 A formally real Euclidean field E is not quadratically closed (as −1 is not a square in E) but the quadratic extension E() is quadratically closed.
 Let E/F be a finite extension where E is quadratically closed.  Either −1 is a square in F and F is quadratically closed, or −1 is not a square in F and F is Euclidean.  This "going-down theorem" may be deduced from the Diller–Dress theorem.

Quadratic closure
A quadratic closure of a field F is a quadratically closed field containing F which embeds in any quadratically closed field containing F.  A quadratic closure for any given F may be constructed as a subfield of the algebraic closure Falg of F, as the union of all iterated quadratic extensions of F in Falg.

Examples
 The quadratic closure of R is C.
 The quadratic closure of Q is the field of complex constructible numbers.

References

 
 

Field (mathematics)